The 1984 Stanford Cardinal football team represented Stanford University in the Pacific-10 Conference (Pac-10) during the 1984 NCAA Division I-A football season. In their first season under head coach Jack Elway, the Cardinal compiled a 5–6 record (3–5 in Pac-10, tied for seventh), and played home games on campus at Stanford Stadium in Stanford, California.

Elway was hired the previous December from nearby San Jose State, where he went   in five seasons. His Spartans had defeated Stanford the previous three years, the first two while his son John Elway was the Cardinal quarterback. Now on the other side, Coach Elway won the South Bay matchup again this season, as Stanford rallied to win by a point to snap the streak.

Schedule

Game summaries

at Oklahoma

Illinois

San Jose State

Stanford snapped a three-game losing streak to the Spartans, rallying to win by a point.

Arizona State

at UCLA

The 23–21 upset on October 6 at the Rose Bowl was head coach Jack Elway's first Pac-10 victory. Making his first-ever collegiate start, backup quarterback Fred Buckley led the Cardinal over the #17 UCLA Bruins, and the redshirt junior was named Pac-10 Offensive Player of the Week.

Washington

Washington State

at Oregon State

Southern California

at Arizona

at California

References

Stanford
Stanford Cardinal football seasons
Stanford Cardinal football